Ricky Jackson (born 2 August 1998) is a New Zealand rugby union player who plays for  in the National Provincial Championship (NPC) and the  in Super Rugby. His playing position is hooker. He was named in the Highlanders squad for week 3 in 2019. In 2020 he was named as a full squad member but before the season started he suffered an ankle injury that ended his season.

Rugby career
He scored his first try for Otago in a 30–7 home win against  on 23 October 2020.

Reference list

External links
Itsrugby.co.uk profile

1998 births
New Zealand rugby union players
Living people
Rugby union hookers
Otago rugby union players
Highlanders (rugby union) players
Crusaders (rugby union) players